The Renault Maxity is a light commercial vehicle with a cab-over-engine style truck launched by the French manufacturer Renault Trucks in 2007. The Maxity is nearly identical to the Nissan Cabstar, sharing the same drive-train and engine options and manufactured on the same Nissan owned production line in Avila, Spain. While the sharing of engines and production facilities is part of the Renault-Nissan Alliance, the vehicle is sold by Renault Trucks which is owned by Volvo.

Specifications

In Europe the Maxity is available from 2.8 to 4.5-tonne versions, but only as a 3.4 or 3.5-tonne in Britain. All are mated to a five-speed or six-speed manual transmission depending on specification.

In 2010, Renault Trucks trialled an electric version with a 2-tonne payload in Paris with drinks distributor Tafanel. The prototype truck was developed in collaboration with electric commercial vehicle manufacturer PVI.

References

External links
Renault Trucks UK sales brochure

Maxity
Pickup trucks
Vans
Cab over vehicles
Vehicles introduced in 2007